The Gourdou-Leseurre Type A, retrospectively named the GL.1, was a prototype fighter aircraft built in France in 1918. It was a conventional parasol-wing monoplane with fixed tailskid undercarriage, with main units connected by a cross-axle. The pilot sat in an open cockpit. Construction was of fabric-covered wood and steel.  Initial flight testing revealed performance superior to most contemporary biplane fighters and led to an order of 100 aircraft being placed. However, further tests suggested that the aircraft structure could be considerably lightened, and that the wing needed to be stiffened, leading to a cancellation of the order.

Only a single prototype was built, but this led to the development of the successful Gourdou-Leseurre Type B.

Operators

French Air Force

Specifications

References
 
 
 

1910s French fighter aircraft
Gourdou-Leseurre aircraft
Aircraft first flown in 1918